Diana Isabel Alfaro Guadalupe (born 25 August 2001) is a Peruvian footballer who plays as a defender for Sporting Cristal and the Peru women's national team.

International career
Alfaro represented Peru at the 2017 Bolivarian Games. At senior level, she played in a 0–12 friendly loss to Chile on 28 May 2017. She was about to be part of the squad for the 2018 Copa América Femenina, but got injured shortly before the start of the tournament and was replaced by Carmen Suárez.

References

2001 births
Living people
Women's association football defenders
Peruvian women's footballers
Sportspeople from Callao
Peru women's international footballers
Sporting Cristal footballers